Daniil Kovalev (born 25 March 2001) is a Belarusian professional footballer who plays for Orsha.

References

External links 
 
 

2001 births
Living people
People from Mogilev
Sportspeople from Mogilev Region
Belarusian footballers
Association football midfielders
FC Dnepr Mogilev players
FC Dinamo Minsk players
FC Gorki players
FC Smorgon players
FC Lokomotiv Gomel players
FC Orsha players